Leroy Vann (born November 18, 1986) is a former American football cornerback and return specialist. He was signed by the San Francisco 49ers as an undrafted free agent in 2010. He played college football at Florida A&M.

Vann has been a member of the Cincinnati Bengals.

Early life
Vann attended Howard W. Blake High School in Tampa, Florida.

College career
Vann attended Florida A&M University and played college football for the Florida A&M Rattlers where he was an excellent punt returner and kick returner, returning seven punts for touchdowns.

Professional career
Vann was signed by the San Francisco 49ers as an undrafted free agent following the 2010 NFL Draft. He was waived on August 9, 2010.

Vann signed with the Montreal Alouettes of the Canadian Football League (CFL) in 2010. He spent his time on special teams, returning kicks and punts.

He was signed as a free agent by the Cincinnati Bengals on August 17, 2011, but was waived on August 27.

References

External links
San Francisco 49ers bio

1986 births
Living people
Players of American football from Tampa, Florida
Players of Canadian football from Tampa, Florida
American football cornerbacks
American football return specialists
Florida A&M Rattlers football players
San Francisco 49ers players
Montreal Alouettes players
Cincinnati Bengals players
Georgia Force players
Columbus Lions players
San Antonio Talons players